Oyster thief is a common name for two unrelated species of seaweed:

Codium fragile, a green algae in the family Codiaceae
Colpomenia sinuosa, a brown algae in the family Scytosiphonaceae